Santino de la Tore (aka Santino and SDLT) is a musician, composer, songwriter, videographer and vocalist from Peru. He is best known for his music career in South America and his music placements in major Hollywood films and TV series, the most popular including Steven Spielberg's The War of the Worlds, and the TV series Prison Break, The Shield and Homeland.

Early life 
Santino de la Tore was born Cesar Santino de la Tore on June 6, 1973, in Lima, Peru. The youngest of five siblings, Santino was raised in a musically inclined family which supported his artistic pursuits and ambitions from an early age. During his adolescence, Santino pursued his talent in football by joining his local Lima Cricket & Football Club. At only 14 he was invited to play soccer professionally in Seattle, an offer he declined due to his more powerful passion for music.
At 18, Santino traveled to the Netherlands in search of record labels for his first band Sentencia, returning to Peru after a few months to enter and win various local music contests. At age 19, he joined Peru's renowned rock band, Frágil.

Music

1987-1990: Sentencia debut 
Santino's music career lifted off in the early eighties with his debut appearance in Peru's first heavy metal band Sentencia. Santino recorded one album with the band before departing in 1991.

1992-1997: Frágil and rise to fame 
In 1992 Santino joined Frágil, one of South America's most prominent progressive rock bands. He remained the band's lead vocalist until 1997 when he decided to quit in order to "keep growing artistically". During the Frágil period, Santino toured both South America and the US, appearing as a featured guest in a multitude of top tier media and TV shows such as Univision, Telemundo, Panamericana and more. It is during this era that his career was at a peak and the overall popularity "was just overwhelming".

1997-2002: LA move and Likido 
The sudden rise to fame that Santino had garnered during his career with Frágil brought him to a new life-plan: the pursuit of the American Dream. This endeavor led him to relocate from Peru to California in 1997. In 2000 he formed Likido, a rock band he led for three years. Likido opened shows for bands like Maná and Concrete Blonde.

2002 – Present: Solo career and Hollywood placements 
In 2002 the music industry veteran Miles Copeland (The Police, Sting, IRS Records) spotted Santino performing at a club in Los Angeles and invited him to his castle in France to discuss his career. Per his suggestions, Santino launched his solo career. Santino's first solo album was released in 2005. Followed by an array of albums and solo projects, Santino became noted for his ability to infuse a variety of musical styles such as Rock, electronica, rumba, reggae, trip hop, Latin, and jazz.
Santino's music first caught the attention of Hollywood producers in 2005. Infierno was his debut placement, featured in Steven Spielberg's War of the Worlds (2005). His music has since been featured in a wide range of films and TV series.

Music Awards 
Santino has received the Billboard Songwriting Award(2007) and the Icarus Prize (2009) for his contribution to Peruvian culture.

Additional Projects 
While still residing in Peru, Santino studied communications, TV and Script Writing. He went on to work as a producer and stage manager for Latin TV shows such as Trato Hecho, 12 Corazones, and El Tribunal Del Pueblo.
In 2008 he crossed over to the American market and worked for various broadcast television networks such as En La Zona and LATV En Concierto.
In 2010 Santino decided his main passion and talent was to be a director. He has since directed over 100 music videos, establishing thus his own production company SDLT Films. His clients predominantly include high-tech industries and toy companies.
Santino is the Video Director & Music Composer of Evollve (the maker of Ozobot).

Personal life 
Santino is married to Anouk Zisa.  The couple has two children, son Matias (born April 25, 2008) and daughter Alexa Zoe (born December 30, 2013). Santino and his family reside in Los Angeles.

Discography

Music Placements

TV Production 
 Writer/Chief Writer/Associate Producer of El Tribunal del Pueblo (2000-2004)
 Writer/Chief Writer/Associate Producer of La Corte Familiar (2000-2004)
 Stage Manager/Assistant Director of Trato Hecho  (2004-2006)
 Stage Manager of 12 Corazones (2006-2007)
 Producer of En La Zona - LATV Networks (2007 -2008)
 Producer of LATV en concierto - LATV Networks (2008-2009)

References 

1973 births
Living people
People from Lima
Peruvian musicians